The in scale (also known as the Sakura pentatonic scale due to its use in the well-known folk song Sakura Sakura) is, according to a traditional theory, one of two pentatonic scales used in much Japanese music, excluding gagaku and Buddhist chanting. The in scale, which contains minor notes, is used specifically in music for the koto and shamisen and is contrasted with the yo scale, which does not contain minor notes.

More recent theory emphasizes that it is more useful in interpreting Japanese melody to view scales on the basis of "nuclear tones" located a fourth apart and containing notes between them, as in the miyako-bushi scale used in koto and shamisen music and whose pitches are equivalent to the in scale:

In scale in the other musical traditions 
In Indian classical music, Gunkali (Hindustani), Raga Salanganata (Indian) and Karnataka Shuddha Saveri (Carnatic) are nearly identical to the pentatonic in scale, highlighting the shared past of their origins. Some rare examples of ancient genres of Andean music (e.g. k'antu) use a scale similar to the in scale combined with melody leading with a parallel fifths and fourths. For example, Machulas Kantu by Bolivia Manta folk group from the album Wiñayataqui.

See also 
 Hirajōshi scale
 Japanese mode
 Japanese musical scales

Sources

Further reading
Hewitt, Michael. 2013. Musical Scales of the World. The Note Tree. .

Pentatonic scales
Japanese music
Andean music
Hemitonic scales
Tritonic scales